Shahrizan Salleh is a Malaysian footballer who is a defender for Shahzan Muda FC. He was member of Pahang FA when they won the first Malaysian Super League 2004.

Honours

Club
 Malaysia Cup:
 Winners (2): 2013, 2014
 FA Cup:
 Winners (1): 2014
 Malaysia Charity Shield Cup :
 Winners (1): 2014

References

External links
 Masa tamatkan kemarau trofi Piala Malaysia - Shahrizan
 Shahrizan impi julang Piala Malaysia
 Shahrizan tidak berasa tertekan

1982 births
Living people
Sri Pahang FC players
Malaysian footballers
People from Pahang
Malaysian people of Malay descent
Association football defenders